Jonathan Wheatley is a British Formula One mechanic and team manager. He is currently the sporting director at the Red Bull Racing Formula One team.

Career
Wheatley began his motorsport career at Benetton as a junior mechanic in the early 1990s. He rose through the ranks at Enstone to become the chief mechanic from 2001 until 2006 when he left for Red Bull Racing.

Wheatley's role in the team is important and includes ensuring that the team is operating within the FIA sporting regulations, monitoring communications, and supervising Red Bull's pit crew, widely regarded to be among the best in Formula One. Red Bull's pit crew broke the world record for fastest Formula One pit stop during the 2019 Brazilian Grand Prix timed at just 1.82 seconds, beating the previous record of 1.88 second set in the 2019 German Grand Prix also by Red Bull.

References

1967 births
Living people
Mechanics (people)
Formula One team principals
Formula One mechanics
Benetton Formula
Red Bull Racing